Pseudobuliminus is a genus of air-breathing land snails, terrestrial pulmonate gastropod mollusks in the subfamily Bradybaeninae of the family Camaenidae.

Species
 Pseudobuliminus buliminoides (Heude, 1882)
 Pseudobuliminus buliminus (Heude, 1882)
 Pseudobuliminus certa (Zilch, 1938)
 Pseudobuliminus conoidius (Heude, 1890)
 Pseudobuliminus cylindrus (Möllendorff, 1899)
 Pseudobuliminus franzhuberi Thach, 2018
 Pseudobuliminus gracilispira (Möllendorff, 1899)
 Pseudobuliminus incertus (L. Pfeiffer, 1866)
 Pseudobuliminus krejcii (Zilch, 1938)
 Pseudobuliminus maestratii Thach, 2017
 Pseudobuliminus meiacoshimensis (A. Adams & Reeve, 1850)
 Pseudobuliminus nanchongensis M. Wu, 2002
 Pseudobuliminus obesus Thach & F. Huber, 2018
 Pseudobuliminus ovoideus Thach & F. Huber, 2018
 Pseudobuliminus piligera (Möllendorff, 1899)
 Pseudobuliminus pinguis (Ancey, 1882)
 Pseudobuliminus pseudobuliminus (Heude, 1882)
 Pseudobuliminus quaternarius (Heude, 1890)
 Pseudobuliminus soleniscus (Möllendorff, 1901)
 Pseudobuliminus subcylindrica (Möllendorff, 1899)
 Pseudobuliminus subdoliolum (Haas, 1935)
 Pseudobuliminus takarai (Kuroda, 1960)
 Pseudobuliminus thachi F. Huber, 2018
 Pseudobuliminus turrita (Gude, 1900)
Synonyms
 Pseudobuliminus incerta (L. Pfeiffer, 1866): synonym of Pseudobuliminus incertus (L. Pfeiffer, 1866) (specific epithet is not in agreement with generic name)
 Pseudobuliminus obesa Thach & F. Huber, 2018: synonym of Pseudobuliminus obesus Thach & F. Huber, 2018 (wrong gender agreement of specific epithet)
 Pseudobuliminus rhombostoma (L. Pfeiffer, 1861): synonym of Anceyoconcha rhombostoma (L. Pfeiffer, 1861)

References

 Schileyko, A. A. (2004). Treatise on Recent terrestrial pulmonate molluscs. Part 12. Bradybaenidae, Monadeniidae, Xanthonychidae, Epiphragmophoridae, Helmintoglyptidae, Elonidae, Humboldtianidae, Spincterochilidae, Cochlicellidae. Ruthenica. Supplement 2: 1627–1763. Moskva
 Bank, R. A. (2017). Classification of the Recent terrestrial Gastropoda of the World. Last update: July 16, 2017

External links
 Gredler, V. M. (1886). Zur Conchylien-Fauna von China. IX. Stück. Malakozoologische Blätter. N. F., 9: 1-20
 Heude, P. M. (1882-1890). Notes sur les mollusques terrestres de la vallée du Fleuve Bleu. Mémoires de l' Histoire naturelle de l' Empire chinois. 1 (2): 2 + 1-87, pls. 12-21

Camaenidae
Gastropod genera